The 1980–81 La Liga season, the 50th since its establishment, started on September 6, 1980, and finished on April 26, 1981.

Real Sociedad won their first title ever.

Teams and location

League table

Results table

Pichichi Trophy 

La Liga seasons
1980–81 in Spanish football leagues
Spain